Scorpaena is a widespread genus of marine ray-finned fish belonging to the family Scorpaenidae, the scorpionfishes.

Taxonomy
Scorpaena was first described as a genus in 1758 by Carl Linnaeus in the 10th Edition of his Systema Naturae. In 1876 Pieter Bleeker designated S. porcus as the type species of the genus. The genus name is based on the Greek word for a scorpion, skorpaina, an allusion to the venomous spines Linnaeus mentioned in his description of S. scrofa.

Species
The 65 recognized species in this genus are:

Characteristics
Scorpaena scorpionfishes have a very bony head which is armed with numerous spines. There is a horizontal bony ridge beneath the eyes with 1-4 spines. They have an occipital pit. The uppermost spine on the preoperculum is the longest. There are patches of teeth on the roof of the mouth and at its sides. There are 12 spines and between 7 and 10 soft rays in the dorsal fin while the anal fin has 3 spines and 5 soft rays. There are 16 to 21 fin rays in the pectoral fin with some of the upper rays being branched in adults. THey have relatively large scales and the scales on the body are smooth. The lateral line is complete and its scales are tubed.

Distribution and habitat
Scorpaena scorpionfishes are found in the tropical and warm temperate zones of the Atlantic, Indian and Pacific Oceans. They are demersal fishes occurring in a number of habitats but are typically found in rocky or coralline habitats.

Biology
Scorpaena scorpionfishes are solitary, ambush predators which use their cryptically patterned, irregularly shaped bodies to camouflage themselves on the substrate. They have large mouths and will eat prey up to half their own size, the vortex created by the sudden opening of the mouth drawing the prey in. They have venomous spines which can inflict serious injuries on humans.

Fisheries
Scorpaena scorpionfishes are caught by recreational and commercial fisheries in some parts of the world. The flesh is regarded as very palatable.

References

External links
 Smith, J.L.B. 1957. The fishes of the Family Scorpaenidae; Part 1: The sub-family Scorpaeninae. Ichthyological Bulletin; No. 4. Department of Ichthyology, Rhodes University, Grahamstown, South Africa.
 Smith, J.L.B. 1957. The fishes of the Family Scorpaenidae; Part 2: The sub-families Pteroinae, Apistinae, Setarchinae and Sebastinae. Ichthyological Bulletin; No. 5. Department of Ichthyology, Rhodes University, Grahamstown, South Africa.
 Smith, J.L.B. 1958. Fishes of the families Tetraogidae, Caracanthidae and Synanciidae from the Western Indian Ocean with further notes on Scorpaenid fishes. Ichthyological Bulletin; No. 12. Department of Ichthyology, Rhodes University, Grahamstown, South Africa.

 
Scorpaenini
Venomous fish
Extant Eocene first appearances
Marine fish genera
Taxa named by Carl Linnaeus